Ulf Puder, born 1958 in Leipzig, is a German painter. He is educated at the Hochschule für Grafik und Buchkunst Leipzig and is associated with the New Leipzig School. His paintings contain semi-abstract architectural and geometrical shapes, often in pastel colours and subdued colours, with a sense of melancholy and decay.

He lives and works in Leipzig and Liemehna, Germany. He is represented by Galerie Jochen Hempel in Germany and Marc Straus in the United States.

References

External links
 Presentation at Marcstraus.com

1958 births
Living people
20th-century German painters
20th-century German male artists
German male painters
21st-century German painters
21st-century German male artists
Artists from Leipzig
German contemporary artists
Hochschule für Grafik und Buchkunst Leipzig alumni